The CMA CGM Tower is a 147 m tall skyscraper in Euroméditerranée, the central business district of Marseille, France. Designed by Zaha Hadid, it is the headquarters for CMA CGM, a major shipping firm, hosting 2,200 employees previously spread over seven sites.

Zaha Hadid was selected to design the building in November 2004 and it became her first built tower.  It is intended to interact with other landmarks of the city including the Château d'If and the basilica of Notre-Dame de la Garde, which stands taller than the tower on a rocky outcrop.
Built by Vinci subsidiary GTM Construction,
the building has 20 lifts to service its 33 floors and was completed in September 2011.

References

External links

 CMA CMG Press Information
 CMA CGM Headquarters by Zaha Hadid photographed by Hufton+Crow
 The CMA CGM Tower: a lighthouse for new shipping routes

Skyscraper office buildings in France
Zaha Hadid buildings
Postmodern architecture
Modernist architecture in France
Office buildings completed in 2011
21st-century architecture in France